

British NVC community MG13 (Agrostis stolonifera - Alopecurus geniculatus grassland) is one of the mesotrophic grassland communities in the British National Vegetation Classification system. It is one of three types of mesotrophic grassland classified as grass-dominated inundation communities.

This community is widely distributed. There are no subcommunities.

Community composition

The following constant species are found in this community:
 Creeping Bent (Agrostis stolonifera)
 Marsh Foxtail (Alopecurus geniculatus)

No rare species are associated with this community.

Distribution

This community is widely distributed throughout the British lowlands, with the most extensive stands in eastern England.

References

 Rodwell, J. S. (1992) British Plant Communities Volume 3 - Grasslands and montane communities  (hardback),  (paperback)

MG13